6726 Suthers, provisional designation , is a background asteroid from the inner regions of the asteroid belt, approximately  in diameter. It was discovered on 5 August 1991, by American astronomer Henry E. Holt at Palomar Observatory in San Diego County, California. The asteroid was name after author Paul Sutherland.

Orbit and classification 

Suthers is a non-family asteroid from the main belt's background population. It orbits the Sun in the inner main-belt at a distance of 2.1–2.5 AU once every 3 years and 6 months (1,263 days). Its orbit has an eccentricity of 0.09 and an inclination of 4° with respect to the ecliptic.

Naming 

In 2012, this minor planet was officially named after Paul Sutherland, author and journalist, who has actively supported the UK-based Society for Popular Astronomy for many years, and who is known as "Suthers" to friends and colleagues. He is author of Where Did Pluto Go? and responsible for bringing many astronomical stories to a wider public.

Physical characteristics 

According to the survey carried out by NASA's Wide-field Infrared Survey Explorer with its subsequent NEOWISE mission, Suthers measures 3.455 kilometers in diameter and its surface has an albedo of 0.207.

References

External links 
 SpaceStories.com – Paul Sutherland
 Skymania website
 The Society for Popular Astronomy website
 Asteroid Lightcurve Database (LCDB), query form (info )
 Dictionary of Minor Planet Names, Google books
 Discovery Circumstances: Numbered Minor Planets (5001)-(10000) – Minor Planet Center
 
 

006726
Discoveries by Henry E. Holt
Named minor planets
19910805